Alberto Puello Calderón (born 22 July 1994) is a Dominican professional boxer who has held the WBA super lightweight title since 2022.

Professional career

Early career
Puello made his professional debut against Marcos Hernandez on 7 March 2015. He won the fight by a first-round technical knockout. Puello amassed a 10–0 record during the next 18 months, before being scheduled to fight for his first title.

Puello faced Abrahan Peralta for the vacant WBA Fedelatin and WBC Latino super-lightweight titles on 24 February 2017. He captured his first professional title by an eight-round stoppage, as Peralta retired from the fight at the end of the eight round. After beating Patrick López by a seventh-round technical knockout on 24 June 2017, Puello was booked to make his first WBA Fedelatin and Latino title defenses against Ricardo Gutierrez on 18 November 2017. He made quick work of his opponent, winning the fight by a first-round knockout. Puello beat Francisco Contreras Lopez by unanimous decision on 22 December 2017, in another stay-busy non-title fight, before being scheduled to face Erick Lopez in his second WBA Fedelatin title defense. He won the fight by unanimous decision.

Puello was booked to face the undefeated Jonathan Alonso for the WBA interim super-lightweight title. The bout was scheduled as the main event of a card which took place at the Coliseo Carlos 'Teo' Cruz in Santo Domingo, Dominican Republic on 27 July 2019. Puello won the fight by unanimous decision, with all three judges scoring the fight 115–113 in his favor. Puello made his first WBA interim title defense against Cristian Rafael Coria on 17 December 2020, following a seventeen-month absence from the sport. He justified his role as the favorite, winning the fight by a seventh-round stoppage, as Coria retired from the bout at the end of the round. Puello made his second and final title defense against Jesus Antonio Rubio on 21 July 2021. The fight was booked as the co-headliner to the WBA interim minimumweight title bout between Erick Rosa and Ricardo Astuvilca. Puello won the fight by unanimous decision, with all three judges awarding him a 120–107 scorecard. On 25 August 2021, Puello was stripped of his interim title, as the WBA eliminated their interim champion designations.

Puello was booked to face Ve Shawn Owens on 18 December 2021, in a 143 pounds catchweight bout, on the undercard of the WBA super middleweight title bout between David Morrell and Alantez Fox. The fight represented Puello's United States debut, as it took place at the Armory in Minneapolis, Minnesota. Puello won the bout by unanimous decision, with scores of 98–92, 100–90 and 99–91.

WBA super lightweight champion

Puello vs. Akhmedov
On March 9, 2022, the undisputed light welterweight champion Josh Taylor was ordered by the WBA to make a mandatory title defense against Puello. As the pair failed to come to terms, a purse bid was called by the WBA for April 22. The bid was won by TGB Promotions, with an offer of $200,000, with a 55/45 split in favor of Taylor. Taylor failed to proceed with the mandatory title defense, and was stripped of his light-welterweight belt as a result. On June 11, 2022, the WBA ordered Puello to face the one-time WBA (Regular) super-lightweight title challenger Batyr Akhmedov for the vacant light-welterweight championship. The fight was scheduled for August 20, 2022, and was set to take place on the undercard of the Adrien Broner and Omar Figueroa Jr. welterweight bout. Puello won the fight by split decision. Two judges scored the fight 117–111 for Puello, while the third judge scored the fight 115–113. Puello became the first super lightweight champion from the Dominican Republic.

Puello vs. Romero
It was revealed on February 8, 2023, that Puello would make his maiden title defense against the one-time WBA lightweight title challenger Rolando Romero. The championship bout is scheduled to take place on May 13, 2023, in the main event of a Showtime broadcast card.

Professional boxing record

See also
List of world light-welterweight boxing champions

References

External links

1994 births
Living people
Dominican Republic male boxers
Light-welterweight boxers
World light-welterweight boxing champions
World Boxing Association champions
People from San Juan de la Maguana